The Development Credit Authority (DCA) was the authority the United States Agency for International Development (USAID) used to issue loan guarantees backed by the full faith and credit of the U.S. government to private lenders, particularly for loans made in local currency. It merged with the Overseas Private Investment Corporation (OPIC) to form the U.S. International Development Finance Corporation (DFC) on December 20, 2019.

The partial loan guarantees extended by USAID, and now through the DFC, allow the U.S. Government to use credit to pursue the development purposes specified under the Foreign Assistance Act (FAA) of 1961, as amended. These guarantees typically cover up to 50% of the principal of loans to entrepreneurs, small-, and medium-sized businesses, and other projects that advance the U.S. Government's international development objectives. Credit assistance's been used in areas such as microenterprise and small enterprise, privatization of public services, infrastructure, efficient and renewable energy, and climate change. 

DCAs do not cover interest income lost: In a country that has, for example, a 30% interest rate, the interest income would represent almost 50% of the total loan value and is not insured via the DCA. In this case, the DCA covers 50% of the principal, but only 25% of the total loan exposure.

References

External links
 https://www.usaid.gov/sites/default/files/documents/1865/DCA_One-Pager_48.pdf
 https://usaid-credit.exposure.co/

United States Agency for International Development
Development finance institutions